Christopher Horace Hewitt (born July 22, 1974) is a former American football defensive back who is the pass game coordinator and secondary coach for the Baltimore Ravens of the National Football League (NFL).

Early life
Hewitt was born in Kingston, Jamaica and grew up in Englewood, New Jersey, where he attended Dwight Morrow High School. He played football, basketball and track while in high school.

College career
He played for the Cincinnati Bearcats football team at the collegiate level. Hewitt's 31.50 kickoff return average in the 1993 season ranks second on the all-time rankings for the Cincinnati Bearcats, while his 742 career kickoff return yards rank ninth and his 28.54 career yards per kickoff returns place him first on the school's rankings.

Professional career
Hewitt played as a defensive back and on special teams for the New Orleans Saints in 1997, starting two games and finishing the season with 12 tackles and a fumble recovery as a defensive back. In 1998, he again started two games and had 9 tackles and two sacks. In his third and final season with the Saints, Hewitt was limited to one tackle and a sack.

Coaching career
Hewitt joined the coaching staff at Rutgers under Greg Schiano, where he spent eight years, including as running backs coach and defensive backs coach. As part of the NFL's Minority Coaching Fellowship Program, Hewitt worked on the staffs of the Cleveland Browns and Philadelphia Eagles, as well as the Ravens, who hired him in February 2012 as the team's assistant special teams coach. Hewitt was brought into the Ravens by head coach John Harbaugh, who had been Hewitt's special teams coach when he was playing at the age of 17 as a freshman at the University of Cincinnati. Hewitt was part of the Ravens coaching staff for the Raven's victory at Super Bowl XLVII in 2013, which was played in New Orleans at the Mercedes-Benz Superdome, where Hewitt played in the NFL with the Saints.

The Ravens promoted Hewitt to pass defense coordinator on February 26, 2020.

References

1974 births
Living people
Baltimore Ravens coaches
Cincinnati Bearcats football players
New Orleans Saints players
Dwight Morrow High School alumni
People from Englewood, New Jersey
Rutgers Scarlet Knights football coaches
Sportspeople from Kingston, Jamaica
Notre Dame Fighting Irish football coaches